Mohamed Nuur Giriig (1935–2002) was a Somali singer, specializing in traditional Somali music.

Biography
Giriig was born in 1935 in Berbera, now Somaliland to a Warsangali Darod family, originally from Las Khorey on the Maakhir Coast.

In 1954, he was among a group of auditioners, from which he was selected to join a troupe of Oud singers. Giriig's musical career began after that, which was marked by a number of hit songs. Most of the latter were recorded during the Somali music scene's Golden Age in the 1960s.

Giriig died in Hargeisa on January 17, 2002.

Discography
Some of Giriig's all-time classic songs include:

Timahaaga Dheeree
Suleikha
Dayaha I Dhibay Halay
Maahee Khadraay
Boodhari Sidiisii
Wacad
Gamaayeey
Soomar

See also
Music of Somalia

External links
 all his songs on masuul

20th-century Somalian male singers
Somalian Muslims
1935 births
2002 deaths